Lysiteles is a genus of Asian crab spiders first described by Eugène Simon in 1895.

Species
 it contains 62 species:

L. ambrosii Ono, 2001 – Bhutan, China
L. amoenus Ono, 1980 – Bhutan, Taiwan
L. anchorus Zhu, Lian & Ono, 2004 – China
L. annapurnus Ono, 1979 – Nepal
L. arcuatus Tang, Yin, Peng, Ubick & Griswold, 2008 – China
L. auriculatus Tang, Yin, Peng, Ubick & Griswold, 2008 – China
L. badongensis Song & Chai, 1990 – China
L. bhutanus Ono, 2001 – Bhutan, China
L. bicuspidatus Yu, Li & Jin, 2017 – China
L. boteus Barrion & Litsinger, 1995 – Philippines
L. brunettii (Tikader, 1962) – India
L. catulus Simon, 1895 – India
L. clavellatus Tang, Yin, Peng, Ubick & Griswold, 2008 – China
L. conflatus Tang, Yin, Peng, Ubick & Griswold, 2008 – China
L. conicus Tang, Yin, Peng, Ubick & Griswold, 2007 – China, Vietnam
L. coronatus (Grube, 1861) – Russia (Far East), China, Korea, Japan
L. corrugus Tang, Yin, Peng, Ubick & Griswold, 2008 – China
L. curvatus Tang, Yin, Peng, Ubick & Griswold, 2008 – China
L. davidi Tang, Yin, Peng, Ubick & Griswold, 2007 – China
L. dentatus Tang, Yin, Peng, Ubick & Griswold, 2007 – China, Vietnam
L. dianicus Song & Zhao, 1994 – China
L. digitatus Zhang, Zhu & Tso, 2006 – Taiwan
L. distortus Tang, Yin, Peng, Ubick & Griswold, 2008 – China
L. excultus (O. Pickard-Cambridge, 1885) – India, Pakistan
L. fanjingensis (Wang, Gan & Mi, 2020) – China
L. furcatus Tang & Li, 2010 – China
L. guoi Tang, Yin, Peng, Ubick & Griswold, 2008 – China
L. himalayensis Ono, 1979 – Nepal, Bhutan, China
L. hongkong Song, Zhu & Wu, 1997 – China
L. inflatus Song & Chai, 1990 – China
L. kunmingensis Song & Zhao, 1994 – Bhutan, China
L. leptosiphus Tang & Li, 2010 – China
L. lepusculus Ono, 1979 – Nepal
L. linzhiensis Hu, 2001 – China
L. magkalapitus Barrion & Litsinger, 1995 – Philippines
L. maius Ono, 1979 – Russia (South Siberia, Far East), Nepal to Japan
L. mandali (Tikader, 1966) – India, China
L. miniatus Ono, 1980 – Japan (Ryukyu Is.)
L. minimus (Schenkel, 1953) – China
L. minusculus Song & Chai, 1990 – Bhutan, China
L. montivagus Ono, 1979 – Nepal
L. nanfengmian (Liu, 2022) – China
L. niger Ono, 1979 – Nepal, Bhutan, China
L. nudus Yu & Zhang, 2017 – China
L. okumae Ono, 1980 – Japan
L. parvulus Ono, 1979 – Nepal
L. punctiger Ono, 2001 – Bhutan, China, Vietnam
L. qiuae Song & Wang, 1991 – China
L. saltus Ono, 1979 – Nepal, Bhutan, China
L. silvanus Ono, 1980 – China, Taiwan
L. sorsogonensis Barrion & Litsinger, 1995 – Philippines
L. spirellus Tang, Yin, Peng, Ubick & Griswold, 2008 – China
L. subdianicus Tang, Yin, Peng, Ubick & Griswold, 2008 – China
L. subspirellus (Liu, 2022) – China
L. suwertikos Barrion & Litsinger, 1995 – Philippines
L. torsivus Zhang, Zhu & Tso, 2006 – China, Taiwan, Vietnam
L. transversus Tang, Yin, Peng, Ubick & Griswold, 2008 – China
L. umalii Barrion & Litsinger, 1995 – Philippines
L. uniprocessus Tang, Yin, Peng, Ubick & Griswold, 2008 – China
L. vietnamensis Logunov & Jäger, 2015 – Vietnam
L. wenensis Song, 1995 – China
L. wittmeri Ono, 2001 – Bhutan

References

Thomisidae
Araneomorphae genera
Spiders of Russia
Spiders of Asia